Allert (also sometimes Allaert, Allerts, Allertz, or Allertsz), is both a surname and a given name. Notable people with the name include:

Surname 
 Märta Allertz (1628 – before 1677), A.K.A. Brita Allerts, the royal mistress of Charles X of Sweden.
 Ejler Allert (1881–1959), a Danish rower who competed in the 1912 Summer Olympics.
 (1940–2010), Swedish textile artist
 Rick Allert, Australian businessman
 Kristiane Allert-Wybranietz (born 1955), German writer and poet.
 Ty Allert (born 1963), former Texas Longhorns and NFL American football player.
 Horace Allert, former American football player in the NFL, then American football coach at Northbrook High School in Houston, Texas, from 1974 to 1979.
Frank Allert, A.K.A. Capital Q, co-founder of Dream Warriors, a Canadian hip hop duo from Toronto, Ontario, in 1988.

Given name 
Allert Pieter Allertsz, mayor of Amsterdam in 1426
Allert Jacob Bijlensz, mayor of Amsterdam in 1427
Allaert van Everdingen (1621–1675), a Dutch Golden Age painter and printmaker.